The Great Crown of Victory is one of the regalia of Thailand. Made of gold and enamelled in red and green during the reign of King Rama I in 1782, the crown is 66 centimeters (26 inches) high and weighs 7.3 kg (16 pounds). In the reign of King Rama IV, a set of diamonds was added to the crown. Also added was a large cut diamond from India to decorate the top of the crown, called the Great Diamond (พระมหาวิเชียรมณี Phra Maha Wichian Mani). The crown is of a distinctive Thai design, being a multi-tiered conical diadem, terminating in a tapering spire.

The crown is worn only when a king is crowned. He places the crown on his own head. The shape of the crown represents the concept of divine monarchy. The tall spire signifies divine authority and the right to rule over his subjects.

The Great Crown of Victory is the most important of the five regalia of Thailand, yet at one time the crown was accorded the same importance as the other regalia.

As symbol 
The Great Crown of Victory is used as part of symbol in many public organization and educational institutions. The rank insignia of Royal Thai Army and Royal Thai Police field grade officers (Major and above) all depicts the grand crown.

Gallery

See also
Chada and mongkut
Coronation of the Thai monarch

References
 

Individual crowns
Regalia of Thailand
Thai headgear
1782 works